The Akademie für Soziologie (German for Academy for Sociology) is a scientific organization of social scientists that do empirical research in Germany. A call for the new organization was published in April 2017 with 112 signatories. The academy was founded in Mannheim in July of the same year. Its president is Thomas Hinz.

German sociologists were divided about whether a new organization was needed or divisive.

The academy is recognized by the German Research Foundation as one of the two societies for the empirical social sciences.

Conference 
 April 2018 in Munich – Wachsende Ungleichheit – gespaltene Gesellschaft? Aktuelle Beiträge der empirisch-analytischen Soziologie

See also 
 Deutsche Gesellschaft für Soziologie
 International Sociological Association

References

External links 
 Akademie für Soziologie

Sociological organizations
2017 establishments in Germany